Gelatinodiscus is a genus of fungi in the family Helotiaceae. This is a monotypic genus, containing the single species Gelatinodiscus flavidus.

References

External links
Gelatinodiscus at Index Fungorum

Helotiaceae
Monotypic Ascomycota genera
Taxa named by Alexander H. Smith